The men's college basketball program of the University of California, Irvine (UC Irvine) was founded in 1965 and is known competitively as the UC Irvine Anteaters. The team has had 7 head coaches in its history. 

Statistics updated through 2018–19season

Notes

References

UC Irvine

UC Irvine Anteaters basketball, men's, coaches